

375001–375100 

|-id=005
| 375005 Newsome ||  || Deb Newsome (born 1957), an amateur astronomer who lived and worked in the Gambia as a missionary at a rural literacy center for over 27 years. || 
|-id=007
| 375007 Buxy ||  || The town of Buxy, located in the department of Saône-et-Loire (Burgundy, France) between Chalon-sur-Saône and Le Creusot. Buxy hosts the observatory of the Society of Astronomy of Saône-et-Loire, which now houses the old telescope made by the discoverer in 1985. || 
|-id=043
| 375043 Zengweizhou ||  || Zeng Wei-Zhou (1988–2015), a Chinese amateur astronomer. || 
|-id=067
| 375067 Hewins ||  || As a professor at Rutgers University, Roger Hewins (born 1940) has pioneered the use of experimental petrology to understand chondrule formation. He also studied meteorites from planetary bodies like Vesta and Mars. Hewins received the Leonard Medal of the Meteoritical Society in 2014 in Casablanca, Morocco. || 
|}

375101–375200 

|-id=176
| 375176 Béziau ||  || Pierre Béziau (1861–1947) was a French amateur astronomer, born near the city of Angers in western France. In 1904, he built an ingenious orrery to illustrate that the orbital movements of the Earth were at the origin of climatic variations. || 
|}

375201–375300 

|-bgcolor=#f2f2f2
| colspan=4 align=center | 
|}

375301–375400 

|-bgcolor=#f2f2f2
| colspan=4 align=center | 
|}

375401–375500 

|-bgcolor=#f2f2f2
| colspan=4 align=center | 
|}

375501–375600 

|-bgcolor=#f2f2f2
| colspan=4 align=center | 
|}

375601–375700 

|-bgcolor=#f2f2f2
| colspan=4 align=center | 
|}

375701–375800 

|-id=798
| 375798 Divini ||  || Eustachio Divini (c.1610–1685) was an Italian astronomer and telescope maker. || 
|}

375801–375900 

|-id=832
| 375832 Yurijmedvedev ||  || Yurij Dmitrievich Medvedev (born 1955), the head of the Solar System Small Bodies Laboratory of the Institute of Applied Astronomy of the Russian Academy of Sciences. || 
|}

375901–376000 

|-bgcolor=#f2f2f2
| colspan=4 align=center | 
|}

References 

375001-376000